Leo Hale Taylor, SMA was an American-born priest of the Catholic Church and member of the Society of African Missions. He was Archbishop of Lagos from 1939 to 1965. Taylor was the first principal of St Gregory's College, Lagos and as bishop, he was considered a pillar of support for the school.

Life
Taylor was born in Minnesota to parents of English and Irish background. Educated at St Joseph's College, Wilton, Cork city, he was ordained a priest on June 23, 1914. Taylor was among the first group of trainee missionaries to attended SMA's seminary in Cork, Ireland. He was lifelong friends with Father Michael O'Flanagan, a nationalist sympathizer, a relationship that must have provoked nationalistic sentiments in Taylor. As founder of African Missionary, an SMA monthly newsletter, his writings were sympathetic to the nationalist cause.

His first missionary appointment was as a staff of the Vicariate of the Bight of Benin's Holy Cross Primary School in Lagos. He served at the school from 1920 to 1924, he then moved to Ibadan to serve as a teacher at St Theresa's Minor Seminary. When St Gregory's College Lagos became a full fledged college, Taylor was appointed its first principal. In February 1934, upon the death of the Irish Bishop of Western Nigeria, Taylor was nominated to succeed him. After the death of Bishop O'Rourke in Lagos, Taylor was brought back to Lagos as the new bishop.

Archbishop
At the beginning of his tenure, the Abeokuta, Oyo and Ibadan Diocese was within the Archdiocese of Lagos. Taylor had the zeal of the early missionaries in West Africa, he spoke Yoruba and was known to sometimes correct the Yoruba interpreter. He was also an avid cyclist and frequently traveled to out stations by road or forest path to practice the sacrament of confirmation or administer to a dying baptized catholic.

To progress the mission of the church in Lagos and to close a gap in the need for elementary school teachers, Taylor established a teachers training school, Blessed Murumba's College at Ile-Ife in 1944. In 1943, he founded the Eucharistic Heart of Jesus Sisters at Ibonwon, an institution that practiced chastity and vows to poverty.

In 1951, Taylor accepted a request from Dominican fathers to manage a new parish in Yaba. The fathers came from St Alberts Province in Chicago. The Parish is now called St Dominic's Parish, Yaba.

He died in 1965.

References

19th-century births
1965 deaths
Roman Catholic archbishops of Lagos
American emigrants to Nigeria
People from Minnesota
American people of English descent
American people of Irish descent
Educators from Ibadan
Educators from Lagos
20th-century Nigerian educators
Founders of Nigerian schools and colleges
Roman Catholic missionaries in Nigeria
20th-century Roman Catholic bishops in Nigeria
Roman Catholic bishops of Benin City
20th-century American Roman Catholic priests
Society of African Missions